Vikulov is a surname. Notable people with the surname include:

Sergei Vikulov (born 1957), Russian ice hockey player
Sergey Vikulov (1922–2006), Soviet Russian poet and editor
Vladimir Vikulov (born 1946), Soviet ice hockey player

Russian-language surnames